The following is a list of notable nature centres and environmental education centres in Australia:

See also
 List of nature centers

References

External links
 Environmental and Zoo Education Centres NSW – NSW Department of Education

Australia
nature centres
 
Nature centres